The Alex Independent School District is a school district based in Alex, Oklahoma United States. It contains an elementary school and a combined middle/high school.

See also
List of school districts in Oklahoma

References

External links
 Alex Overview
 Alex Public Schools

School districts in Oklahoma
Education in Grady County, Oklahoma